Duccio Tessari (11 October 1926 – 6 September 1994) was an Italian director, screenwriter and actor, considered one of the fathers of Spaghetti Westerns.

Born in Genoa, Tessari started in the fifties as documentarist and as screenwriter of peplum films. In 1964 he co-wrote Sergio Leone's A Fistful of Dollars, one year later he gained an impressive commercial success and launched the Giuliano Gemma's career with A Pistol for Ringo and its immediate sequel, The Return of Ringo.

He later touched different genres and worked in RAI TV, directing some successful TV-series. He died of cancer in Rome, at 67. He was married to actress Lorella De Luca.

Filmography 
Note: The films listed as N/A are not necessarily chronological.

References

Bibliography

External links 

 

1926 births
Film people from Genoa
1994 deaths
Italian film directors
20th-century Italian screenwriters
Italian male screenwriters
Spaghetti Western directors
Deaths from cancer in Lazio
Giallo film directors
20th-century Italian male writers